Kirk H. Francis (born August 27, 1947) is a former production sound mixer in the motion picture industry. He mixed production sound for over 60 films, including 12 Years a Slave, Bull Durham, Under Fire, Wonder Boys, Mr. Holland's Opus, Sleepless in Seattle, Tin Cup, and I Dismember Mama.

Francis was given the 2008 Academy Award for Best Sound Mixing for The Bourne Ultimatum, and won two BAFTA awards, for The Bourne Ultimatum in 2008 and LA Confidential in 1998 . For LA Confidential he also received an Academy Award nomination in 1998. He received three Cinema Audio Society Award nominations for his work on LA Confidential, The Bourne Supremacy, and The Bourne Ultimatum.

Personal life
In lieu of college, Francis hitch-hiked in 1967 to Goa, India, where he ran a small export business. Upon his return to the US in 1968, he began his career in sound. He is an environmental activist who helped spearhead the saving of the Putney Woods on Whidbey Island, Washington from certain clear cutting and development. His wife Leslie Larch was once a can-can dancer at the Moulin Rouge in Paris, France.  In 2014, after having spent almost 46 years of his life standing in one spot for 14–16 hours every day while wearing headphones and listening to the far from mellifluous sounds of what amounts to nothing more than an industrial work site, Francis retired from the "movie biz" to better tend his coffee plants. He does not accept work calls. He and Leslie live on the Big Island of Hawai'i.

References

External links
 

1947 births
Living people
American audio engineers
Best Sound Mixing Academy Award winners
Best Sound BAFTA Award winners
People from Oakland, California
Engineers from California